Leovigildo "Leo" Cotte is a Puerto Rican politician and former mayor of Lajas. Cotte is affiliated with the New Progressive Party (PNP) and served as mayor from 2009 to 2013.

References

External links

Living people
Mayors of places in Puerto Rico
New Progressive Party (Puerto Rico) politicians
People from Lajas, Puerto Rico
Year of birth missing (living people)